This article is about the demographic features of the population of Ivory Coast, including population density, ethnicity, education level, health of the populace, economic status, religious affiliations and other aspects of the population.

Population

The proportion of children below the age of 15 in 2010 was 40.9%, 55.3% was between 15 and 65 years of age, while 3.8% was 65 years or older
.

Population Estimates by Sex and Age Group (01.VII.2020):

Population Growth:
1.88% (2016 est.)

Vital statistics
Registration of vital events in the Ivory Coast is not complete. The website Our World in Data  prepared the following estimates based on statistics from the Population Department of the United Nations.

Fertility and Births
Total Fertility Rate (TFR) (Wanted Fertility Rate) and Crude Birth Rate (CBR):

Fertility data as of 2011-2012 (DHS Program):

Ethnic groups

 
Ivory Coast has more than 60 ethnic groups, usually classified into five principal divisions: Akan (east and center, including Lagoon peoples of the southeast), Krou (southwest), Southern Mandé (west), Northern Mandé (northwest), Sénoufo/Lobi (north center and northeast). The Baoulés, in the Akan division, probably comprise the largest single subgroup with 15%-20% of the population. They are based in the central region around Bouaké and Yamoussoukro. The Bétés in the Krou division, the Sénoufos in the north, and the Malinkés in the northwest and the cities are the next largest groups, with 10%-15% of the national population. Most of the principal divisions have a significant presence in neighboring countries.

Of the more than 5 million non-Ivorian Africans living in Ivory Coast, one-third to one-half are from Burkina Faso; the rest are from Ghana, Guinea, Mali, Nigeria, Benin, Senegal, Liberia, and Mauritania. The non-African expatriate community includes roughly 50,000 French (this number may be inaccurate due to the evacuation of roughly 8,000 Frenchmen in November 2004) and possibly 40,000 Lebanese. The number of elementary school-aged children attending classes increased from 22% in 1960 to 67% in 1995.

Languages
French is the official language, while there are 60 living indigenous languages spoken in Ivory Coast. The Dioula dialect of Bambara is the most widely spoken one. Other language groups include the Gur languages, the Senufo languages, the Kru languages (including the Bété languages, Dida, Nyabwa, Wè, and Western Krahn), and the Kwa languages (including Akan, Anyin, and Baoulé).

Religion
The economic development and relative prosperity of Ivory Coast fostered huge demographic shifts during the 20th century. "In 1922, an estimated 100,000 out of 1.6 million (or 6 percent) of people in Côte d'Ivoire were Muslims. By contrast, at independence (in 1960), their share of the population had increased rapidly, and Muslims were moving southward to the cocoa-producing areas and the southern cities. By 1998, [...], Muslims constituted a majority in the north of the country, and approximately 38.6 percent of the total population. This was a significantly larger population than the next largest religious group, Christians, who constituted approximately 29.1 percent of the total." In earlier decades, this shift was mainly due to large-scale immigration from neighboring countries of the interior, that has been going on since colonial times and continued to be promoted during the Houphouet-Boigny era. Since the 1990s, the widening fertility gap between different religious groups has continued to tilt the demographic balance in favor of Muslims although immigration has become less important.

Ivorian diaspora
The table below shows the number of people born in Ivory Coast who have migrated to OECD countries only (the table only includes communities consisting of at least 1,000 members).

Other demographic statistics 
Demographic statistics according to the World Population Review in 2022.

One birth every 33 seconds	
One death every 2 minutes	
One net migrant every 360 minutes	
Net gain of one person every 46 seconds

The following demographic are from the CIA World Factbook unless otherwise indicated.

Population
28,713,423 (2022 est.)
26,260,582 (July 2018 est.)
21,058,798 (2010 est.)

Age structure

0-14 years: 38.53% (male 5,311,971/female 5,276,219)
15-24 years: 20.21% (male 2,774,374/female 2,779,012)
25-54 years: 34.88% (male 4,866,957/female 4,719,286)
55-64 years: 3.53% (male 494,000/female 476,060)
65 years and over: 2.85% (2020 est.) (male 349,822/female 433,385)

0-14 years: 39.59% (male 5,213,630 /female 5,182,872)
15-24 years: 19.91% (male 2,613,772 /female 2,615,680)
25-54 years: 34.25% (male 4,577,394 /female 4,416,408)
55-64 years: 3.47% (male 460,048 /female 451,604)
65 years and over: 2.78% (male 325,510 /female 403,664) (2018 est.)

total: 19.9 years. Country comparison to the world: 192nd
male: 20 years 
female: 19.8 years (2018 est.)

Birth rate
28.3 births/1,000 population (2022 est.) Country comparison to the world: 35th
30.1 births/1,000 population (2018 est.) Country comparison to the world: 36th

Death rate
7.6 deaths/1,000 population (2022 est.) Country comparison to the world: 105th
8.4 deaths/1,000 population (2018 est.) Country comparison to the world: 80th

Total fertility rate
3.53 children born/woman (2022 est.) Country comparison to the world: 37th
3.83 children born/woman (2018 est.) Country comparison to the world: 38th

Population growth rate
2.19% (2022 est.) Country comparison to the world: 36th
2.3% (2018 est.) Country comparison to the world: 33rd

Median age
total: 20.3 years. Country comparison to the world: 190th
male: 20.3 years
female: 20.3 years (2020 est.)

Mother's mean age at first birth
19.6 years (2011/12 est.)
note: median age at first birth among women 20-49

Contraceptive prevalence rate
23.3% (2018)
15.5% (2016)

Net migration rate
1.18 migrant(s)/1,000 population (2022 est.) Country comparison to the world: 62nd
0 migrant(s)/1,000 population (2017 est.) Country comparison to the world: 79th

Sex ratio

Life expectancy at birth
total population: 62.26 years. Country comparison to the world: 212nd
male: 60.07 years
female: 64.52 years (2022 est.)

total population: 60.1 years (2018 est.)
male: 58 years (2018 est.)
female: 62.4 years (2018 est.)

Dependency ratios
total dependency ratio: 83.8 (2015 est.)
youth dependency ratio: 78.5 (2015 est.)
elderly dependency ratio: 5.3 (2015 est.)
potential support ratio: 18.9 (2015 est.)

Urbanization
urban population: 52.7% of total population (2022)
rate of urbanization: 3.38% annual rate of change (2020–25 est.)

urban population: 50.8% of total population (2018)
rate of urbanization: 3.38% annual rate of change (2015–20 est.)

Religions
Muslim 42.9%, Catholic 17.2%, Evangelical 11.8%, Methodist 1.7%, other Christian 3.2%, animist 3.6%, other religion 0.5%, none 19.1% (2014 est.)
note: the majority of foreign migrant workers are Muslim (72.7%) and Christian (17.7%)

HIV/AIDS
adult prevalence rate: 2.8% (2017 est.)
people living with HIV/AIDS: 500,000 (2017 est.)
deaths: 24,000 (2017 est.)

Major infectious diseases

Note: highly pathogenic H5N1 avian influenza has been identified in this country; it poses a negligible risk with extremely rare cases possible among US citizens who have close contact with birds (2009)

Nationality
Noun and adjective: Ivorian (Ivoirian)

Ethnic Groups

Education expenditures
3.7% of GDP (2019) Country comparison to the world: 112nd

Literacy
definition: age 15 and over can read and write (2015 est.)

total population: 89.9%
male: 93.1%
female: 86.7% (2019)

total population: 47.2% (2018 est.)
male: 53.7% (2018 est.)
female: 40.5% (2018 est.)

School life expectancy (primary to tertiary education)
total: 10 years
male: 11 years
female: 10 years (2019)

Unemployment, youth ages 15-24
total: 3.9% (2016 est.)
male: 2.8% (2016 est.)
female: 5.1% (2016 est.)

Major infectious diseases
degree of risk: very high (2020)
food or waterborne diseases: bacterial diarrhea, hepatitis A, and typhoid fever
vectorborne diseases: malaria, dengue fever, and yellow fever
water contact diseases: schistosomiasis
animal contact diseases: rabies
respiratory diseases: meningococcal meningitis

See also
French people in Ivory Coast

References

 
Society of Ivory Coast